Dumas is a city in Moore County, Texas, United States. The population was 14,501 at the 2020 census. It is the county seat of Moore County. Located about 40 miles north of Amarillo, the city is named for its founder, Louis Dumas (1856–1923). Dumas Avenue, the main thoroughfare, is also United States Highways 287 and 87.

Window on the Plains Museum, which offers exhibits on Moore County and the Texas Panhandle, is located on South Dumas Avenue, the main thoroughfare.  Dumas is home to Moore County Airport, a general-aviation airport 2 miles west of the central business district.

The Dumas government claims, with some documentation, that the song "I'm a Ding Dong Daddy From Dumas" was written about the city. Composed in the late 1920s by Phil Baxter (a native Texan who lived for a time in Dumas) and Carl Moore, the song has also sometimes been claimed by Dumas in Desha County in southeastern Arkansas.

Geography

Dumas is located at  (35.862478, –101.966931).

Demographics

2020 census

As of the 2020 United States census, there were 14,501 people, 4,343 households, and 3,195 families residing in the city.

2010 census
As of the census of 2010,  14,691 people (an increase of 6.9% from the 2000 Census), 4,979 households, and 3,725 families resided in the city. The population density was 2,660 people per square mile (1,028/km). The 5,340 housing units averaged 1047 per square mile (650.6/km). The racial makeup of the city was 74.9% White, 2% African American, 0.9% Native American, 4.7% Asian, 15.6% from other races, and 1.8% from two or more races. Hispanics or Latino of any race were 50.5% of the population.

Of the 4,979 households, 38.6% had children under the age of 18 living with them, 56.7% were married couples living together, 12.1% had a female householder with no husband present, and 25.2% were not families. About 20.9% of all households were made up of individuals living alone, and 8% had someone living alone who was 65 years of age or older. The average household size was 2.92 and the average family size was 3.40.

In the city, the population was distributed as 31.4% under the age of 18, 7.9% from 15 to 19, 33.3% from 25 to 44, 21.8% from 45 to 64, and 10.7% who were 65 years of age or older.  For every 100 females, there were 101 males.  Of the population over the age of 18, for every 100 females, there were 98 males.

The median income for a household in the city was $44,298, and for a family was $52,536. Males had a median income of $37,589 versus $25,498 for females. The per capita income for the city was $18,614. About 8.3% of families and 11.4% of the population were below the poverty line, including 19% of those under age 18 and 6.3% of those age 65 or over.

Government 
The City of Dumas describes its government as a commission-manager government with a mayor and four commissioners all elected from the city at-large, and a city manager appointed by the commission to serve as the administrative manager of the city.

Economy 
A large meatpacking plant in Cactus is a major employer for Moore County. The plant was formerly owned by Swift, and is now owned by a Brazilian conglomerate, JBS USA. The plant processes up to 5,000 head of cattle per day, and has a predominantly immigrant workforce.

Education 

Dumas Independent School district serves the cities of Dumas and Cactus.

Secondary schools 

 Dumas High School (Dumas, grades 9–12)
 Dumas Junior High School (Dumas, grades 7–8)
 1999–2000 National Blue Ribbon School
 Dumas Intermediate School (Dumas, grades 5–6)

Primary schools 

 Dumas Intermediate School (Dumas)
 Green Acres Elementary School (Dumas)
 Hillcrest Elementary School (Dumas)
 Morningside Elementary School (Dumas)
 Sunset Elementary School (Dumas)
 Cactus Elementary School (Cactus)

Alternative schools 

The North Plains Opportunity Center is an alternative school located within the Dumas Independent School District. The primary function of the school is to provide an alternative education for students who are at risk of dropping out of school, needing to recover lost credits, or desire to accelerate their education experiences to pursue college or career goals.

Colleges 

Amarillo College, a two-year, fully accredited community college, has a branch campus in Dumas.

Notable people

 Joe "King" Carrasco, born in Dumas
 Tommy Shannon, Bassist who is best known as a member of Stevie Ray Vaughan & Double Trouble
 David A. Swinford, Republican former State Representative; now a lobbyist

Gallery

Climate
According to the Köppen climate classification system, Dumas has a semiarid climate, BSk on climate maps.

References

External links

 City of Dumas
 Handbook of Texas

Cities in Texas
Cities in Moore County, Texas
County seats in Texas
Micropolitan areas of Texas